The 1982–83 season was the 72nd season in Hajduk Split’s history and their 37th in the Yugoslav First League. Their 3rd place finish in the 1981–82 season meant it was their 37th successive season playing in the Yugoslav First League.

Competitions

Overall

Yugoslav First League

Classification

Results summary

Results by round

Matches

Yugoslav First League

Sources: hajduk.hr

Yugoslav Cup

Sources: hajduk.hr

UEFA Cup

Source: hajduk.hr

Player seasonal records

Top scorers

Source: Competitive matches

See also
1982–83 Yugoslav First League
1982–83 Yugoslav Cup

References

External sources
 1982–83 Yugoslav First League at rsssf.com
 1982–83 Yugoslav Cup at rsssf.com
 1982–83 UEFA Cup at rsssf.com

HNK Hajduk Split seasons
Hajduk Split